This is a list of famous people which are of Basque ancestry. For this purpose, people considered are those with ancestors –either fully or partially– from the extended Basque Country (including the Basque Autonomous Community, the French Basque Country and Navarre).

It does not include people 
 born or resident in the Basque Country, unless self-identifying as not Basque (e.g. Galician immigrants, French immigrants etc.)
 people born outside the Basque Country of Basque ancestry that either speak Basque or self-identify as being of Basque stock.

For notable Basques, please see List of Basques.

Artists

 Jean Anouilh, dramatist
 Joe Ansolabehere, animation screenwriter and producer
 Earl W. Bascom, American artist and sculptor
 Maitena Burundarena, Argentinian cartoonist
 Hector Elizondo, Puerto Rican actor
 María Félix, Mexican actress
 Galen Gering, movie actor
 Frederic Remington, American western artist and sculptor
 Benicio del Toro, Puerto Rican actor and film producer
 Benjamin Urrutia, writer
 Ricardo Estanislao Zulueta, contemporary interdisciplinary artist and writer

Athletes
 Javier Aguirre, footballer.
 Frenchy Bordagaray, Major League baseball player.
 Sergio Goycochea, footballer.
 John Jaso, major league baseball player
 Valeri Kharlamov, ice hockey player
 Guillermo Ochoa, footballer.
 Julio Olarticoechea, footballer. World cup winner.
 Ted Williams, former Major League baseball player.
 Rupert de Larrinaga, skier.

Business people
 Dominique Amestoy, founder of the Farmers and Merchants Bank
 John Arrillaga, real estate.
 Emilio Azcarraga Vidaurreta, television.
 Roberto Goizueta, former president, chairman and CEO of the Coca-Cola Company
 Joseph A. Unanue, businessman.
 Zobel de Ayala family. Real estate, banking, and telecommunications.
 Jose Arechabala Aldama, founder of the original 'Havana Club' Rum Corporation of Cuba.

Clergy
 Miguel Zugastegui

Explorers
 Juan Bautista de Anza I
 Sebastian Vizcaino
 Felipe de Salcedo
 Juan de Salcedo
 Juan de Oñate
 Pedro Sarmiento de Gamboa
 Jedediah Smith

Journalists
 Cristina Saralegui

Military figures
 Eugene W. Biscailuz 
 Charles de Salaberry
 Margot Duhalde

Musicians

 David Archuleta, singer.
 Cecilia Arizti, Cuban composer.
 Willy DeVille, singer.
 Manu Chao.
 Plácido Domingo, singer.
 Andrea Echeverri.
 Juan Esteban Aristizabal Vásquez (known as "Juanes"), Colombian singer.
 Rocio Igarzábal, Argentine singer, actress, model.
 José Iturbi, composer, conductor and pianist.
 Carlos Jean Arriaga, singer and DJ.
 Roland Orzabal.
 Maurice Ravel, composer.
 Enrique Bunbury, Spanish singer, born in Zaragoza as Enrique Ortiz de Landazuri Izardui.
 Treavor Alvarado Abilez Yturriaga (Known s "DJ Trevi") disc jockey, composer.

Patrons of the Arts
 Juan Antonio de Urrutia y Arana

Philosophers
 John Etchemendy
 Luce Irigaray, Belgian-born French feminist philosopher and linguist

Political figures
 Alfredo Arrieta Argentinian military and Senator. Brother-in-law of Juan Domingo Perón
 Doroteo Arango (Pancho Villa), revolutionary.
 José María Aznar, former Prime Minister of Spain
 David H. Bieter, mayor of Boise, Idaho.
 Simón Bolívar, Venezuelan military and political leader who liberated much of South America from Spanish rule 
 Domingo Bordaberry, Uruguayan politician.
 Juan María Bordaberry, President of Uruguay.
 Pedro Bordaberry, from Uruguay.
 Pete T. Cenarrusa, secretary of State of Idaho.
 Buenaventura Durruti, Spanish revolutionary and Anarcho-syndicalist militant. 
 Luis Echeverría, President of Mexico implicated in charges of genocide for the Tlatelolco Massacre
 Manuel Fraga Iribarne, minister of Franco's dictatorship and afterwards founder of the Spanish Partido Popular.
 John Garamendi, Lt. Governor of California.
 Emílio Garrastazu Médici, president of Brazil.
 Che Guevara, revolutionary.
 Agustín de Iturbide, Emperor of Mexico.
 Jorge Larrañaga, from Uruguay.

 Octaviano Ambrosio Larrazolo, former Governor of New Mexico.
 Paul Laxalt, U.S. Governor and Senator.
 José Mujica, president of Uruguay
 José F. Ozámiz
 Eva Duarte de Perón, Argentinian leader and politician. Wife of Juan Domingo Perón
 Augusto Pinochet Ugarte, Chilean dictator 
 Ignace-Michel-Louis-Antoine d'Irumberry de Salaberry.
 Étienne de Silhouette, Controller-General of Finances under Louis XV; namesake of the term silhouette
 Zenón de Somodevilla y Bengoechea, Marquis of Ensenada, former Prime Minister of Spain.
 Rafael Urdaneta, last president of the Republic of Great Colombia.
 Álvaro Uribe, President of Colombia (2002–2010)
 Ben Ysursa, Secretary of State of Idaho.
 Rosario Ibarra, Mexican human rights activist and presidential candidate. 
 Máxima Zorreguieta, Argentinian Queen of the Netherlands.
 Marcelo de Azcárraga y Palmero, prime minister of Spain.

Scientists
 Florence Bascom, geologist.
 Louis Daguerre, inventor of photography.

Writers
 Gloria E. Anzaldua, Chicana feminist writer and activist
 Alexandre Dumas fils
 José de Echegaray Eizaguirre, Nobel Prize Laureate
 Gabriela Mistral, Nobel Prize Laureate
 Benjamin Urrutia
 William Carlos Williams, American poet and medical doctor, Pulitzer Prize laureate

References

Lists of people by ethnicity
Basque diaspora
People of Basque descent